The Berenstain Bears is a Gemini Award-nominated animated television series based on the children's book series of the same name by Stan and Jan Berenstain.

Series overview

Episodes

Season 1 (2003)
Note: In the United States, all the episodes in season 1 (except for "The Homework Hassle" and "Go To Camp") aired alongside Seven Little Monsters on PBS Kids. Beginning in Fall 2003, all 26 episodes were paired with another Berenstain Bears episode.

Season 2 (2003)

Season 3 (2003-2004)

References

Lists of Canadian children's animated television series episodes
Berenstain Bears